Arthur Doherty (19 January 1932 – 6 February 2003) was a Social Democratic and Labour Party (SDLP) politician, who was a  Member of the Northern Ireland Assembly (MLA) for  East Londonderry from 1998 to 2002.

Born in County Donegal, Doherty studied in Strabane, then at St Columb's College in Derry before becoming a teacher.  He later studied Education and Arts and Design at the University of Ulster and became active in the Irish National Teachers Organisation.

Doherty was involved in the civil rights movement, and joined the Social Democratic and Labour Party (SDLP), later serving on its executive.  He was elected to Limavady Borough Council in 1977, serving as Mayor of Limavady in 1993.  In 1996, he was elected to the Northern Ireland Forum representing East Londonderry, and he held his seat at the 1998 Northern Ireland Assembly election.  He resigned from the Assembly with effect from 1 September 2002 and was replaced by Michael Coyle.  He died the following year, after a short illness.

References

1932 births
2003 deaths
Members of the Northern Ireland Forum
Northern Ireland MLAs 1998–2003
Social Democratic and Labour Party MLAs
Mayors of places in Northern Ireland
Members of Limavady Borough Council